Hillsdale High School is a public high school in Hillsdale, Michigan. It is the only high school in the Hillsdale Community School district.  Their nickname is the Hornets.  They are members of the Lenawee County Athletic Association.

The boundary of the school district, and therefore that of Hillsdale High, includes Hillsdale, most of Hillsdale Township, and portions of these townships: Allen, Adams, Cambria, Fayette, Jefferson, and Woodbridge.

References

External links
 District Website

Schools in Hillsdale County, Michigan
Public high schools in Michigan
Hillsdale, Michigan